The Congressional Caucus on Turkey and Turkish Americans (Turkey Caucus) was established by US Congressmen Robert Wexler (D-Florida), Ed Whitfield (R-Kentucky) and Kay Granger (R-Texas) in March 2001.

The Turkey Caucus is a bi-partisan platform for members of the Caucus to focus on US–Turkey relations and issues that concern Turkish Americans. Many of its members have joined this caucus due to the efforts of their Turkish American constituents and friends of Turkey.

The Caucus has 136 members as of May 2015.

Breakdown of the current membership
 53 Democrats
 83 Republicans

Members of the Caucus

Co-chairs
 Steve Cohen (D-TN)
 Ed Whitfield (R-KY)
 Virginia Foxx (R-NC)
 Gerry Connolly (D-VA)

Senators
 John Boozman (R-Arkansas)
 Lindsey Graham (R-South Carolina)
 Christopher S. Murphy (D-Connecticut) 
 Roger Wicker (R-Mississippi)

Representatives
 Ed Whitfield (R-Kentucky/1st), co-chair
 Steve Cohen (D-Tennessee/9th), co-chair
 Virginia Foxx (R-North Carolina/5th), co-chair
 Gerry Connolly (D-Virginia/11th), co-chair
 Robert Aderholt (R-Alabama/4th)
 Mark Amodei (R-Nevada/2nd)
 Joe Barton (R-Texas/6th)
 Don Beyer (D-Virginia/8th)
 Rob Bishop (R-Utah/1st)
 Marsha Blackburn (R-Tennessee/7th)
 Madeleine Bordallo (D-Guam/At-large)
 Charles W. Boustany (R-Louisiana/3rd)
 Brendan Boyle (D-Pennsylvania/13th)
 Jim Bridenstine (R-Oklahoma/1st)
 Mo Brooks (R-Alabama/5th)
 Susan Brooks (R-Indiana/5th)
 Larry Bucshon (R-Indiana/8th)
 G. K. Butterfield (D-North Carolina/1st)
 André Carson (D-Indiana/7th)
 Steve Chabot (R-Ohio/1st)
 Yvette Clarke (D-New York/11th)
 Lacy Clay (D-Missouri/1st)
 Mike Coffman (R-Colorado/6th)
 Tom Cole (R-Oklahoma/4th)
 Doug Collins (R-Georgia/9th)
 Barbara Comstock (R-Virginia/10th)
 Mike Conaway (R-Texas/11th)
 Kevin Cramer (D-Texas 28th)
 Henry Cuellar (D-Texas/28th)
 John Culberson (R-Texas/7th)
 Danny K. Davis (D-Illinois/7th)
 Suzan DelBene (D-Washington
 Lloyd Doggett (D-Texas/25th)
 Jeff Duncan (R-South Carolina/3rd)
 Donna Edwards (D-Maryland/4th)
 Keith Ellison (D-Minnesota/5th)
 Renee Ellmers (R-North Carolina/2nd)
 Elizabeth Esty (D-Connecticut/5th)
 Trent Franks (R-Arizona/2nd)
 Paul Gosar (R-Arizona/1st)
 Kay Granger (R-Texas/12th)
 Alan Grayson (D-Florida/9th)
 Gene Green (D-Texas/29th)
 Tim Griffin (R-Arkansas/2nd)
 Frank Guinta (R-New Hampshire/1st)
 Brett Guthrie (R-Kentucky/2nd)
 Richard L. Hanna (R- New York/22nd)
 Andy Harris (R-Maryland/1st)
 Alcee Hastings (D-Florida/23rd)
 Jeb Hensarling (R-Texas/5th)
 Brian Higgins (D-New York/27th)
 Jim Himes (D-Connecticut/4th)
 George Holding (R-North Carolina/13th)
 Michael Honda (D-California/15th)
 Richard Hudson (R-North Carolina/8th)
 Randy Hultgren (R-Illinois/14th)
 Sheila Jackson Lee (D-Texas/18th)
 Hakeem Jeffries (D-New York/8th)
 Bill Johnson (R-Ohio/6th)
 Eddie Bernice Johnson (D-Texas/30th)
 Hank Johnson (D-Georgia/4th)
 Walter B. Jones Jr. (R-North Carolina/3rd)
 Steve King (R-Iowa/4th)
 Adam Kinzinger (R-Illinois/11th)
 Ann McLane Kuster (D-New Hampshire/2nd)
 Leonard Lance (R-New Jersey/7th)
 Robert E. Latta (R-Ohio/5th)
 John Lewis (D-Georgia/5th)
 Daniel Lipinski (D-Illinois/3rd)
 Cynthia Lummis (R-Wyoming/At-large)
 Sean Patrick Maloney (D-New York/18th)
 Michael McCaul (R-Texas/10th)
 Betty McCollum (D-Minnesota/4th)
 Jim McDermott (D-Washington/7th)
 Mark Meadows (R-North Carolina/11th)
 Gregory Meeks (D-New York/6th)
 Luke Messer (R-Indiana/6th)
 Mick Mulvaney (R-South Carolina/5th)
 Tim Murphy (R-Pennsylvania/18th)
 Kristi Noem (R-South Dakota/At-large)
 Eleanor H. Norton (D-District of Columbia/At-large)
 Pete Olson (R-Texas/22nd)
 Bill Pascrell (D-New Jersey/8th)
 Steve Pearce (R-New Mexico/2nd)
 Erik Paulsen (R-Minnesota/3rd)
 Steve Pearce (R-New Mexico/2nd)
 Scott Perry (R-Pennsylvania/4th)
 Collin Peterson (D-Minnesota/7th)
 Pedro Pierluisi (D-Puerto Rico/At-large)
 Robert Pittenger (R-North Carolina/9th)
 Joe Pitts (R-Pennsylvania/16th)
 Jared Polis (D-Colorado/2nd)
 David Price (D-North Carolina/4th)
 Tom Price (R-Georgia/6th)
 Mike Quigley (D-Illinois/5th)
 Scott Rigell (R-Virginia/5th)
 Dana Rohrabacher (R-California/46th)
 Todd Rokita (R-Indiana/4th)
 Ileana Ros-Lehtinen (R-Florida/18th)
 Dennis Ross (R-Florida/12th)
 Dutch Ruppersberger (D-Maryland/2nd)
 Bobby Rush (D-Illinois/1st)
 Tim Ryan (D-Ohio/13th)
 Gregorio Sablan (D-Mariana Islands/At-large)
 Matt Salmon (R-Arizona 5th)
 Loretta Sanchez (D-California/47th)
 Steve Scalise (R-Louisiana/4th)
 Austin Scott (R-Georgia/8th)
 David Scott (D-Georgia/13th)
 Pete Sessions (R-Texas/32nd)
 Bill Shuster (R-Pennsylvania/9th)
 Mike Simpson (R-Idaho/2nd)
 Louise Slaughter (D-New York/28th)
 Adam Smith (D-Washington/9th)
 Steve Stivers (R-Ohio/15th)
 Marlin Stutzman (R-Indiana/3rd)
 Bennie Thompson (D-Mississippi/2nd)
 Glenn Thompson (R-Pennsylvania/5th)
 Scott Tipton (R-Colorado/3rd)
 Paul Tonko (D-New York/20th)
 Michael Turner (R-Ohio/10th)
 Marc Veasey (D-Texas/33rd)
 Greg Walden (R-Oregon/2nd)
 Jackie Walorski (R-Indiana/2nd)
 Randy Weber (R-Texas/14th)
 Lynn Westmoreland (R-Georgia/3rd)
 Frederica Wilson (D-Florida/24th)
 Joe Wilson (R-South Carolina/2nd)
 Rob Wittman (R-Virginia/1st)
 Kevin Yoder (R-Kansas/3rd)
 Don Young (R-Alaska/At-large)
 Todd Young (R-Indiana/9th)
 Lee Zeldin (D-New York/1st)

External links
 Caucus information
 List of members

Caucuses of the United States Congress
Turkey–United States relations
2001 establishments in the United States